Cemetery Miséricorde is one of the major cemeteries in Nantes, France. It is located in the Hauts-Pavés - Saint-Félix district. It was opened in 1793 and over 10,000 graves have been placed their between then and 2010.

Gallery

Cemeteries in France
Nantes